Spatial multiplexing or space-division multiplexing (often abbreviated SM, SDM or SMX) is a multiplexing technique in MIMO wireless communication, fibre-optic communication and other communications technologies used to transmit independent channels separated in space.

( Other multiplexing techniques include FDM (frequency-division multiplexing), TDM (time-division multiplexing) or PDM (polarization-division multiplexing). )

Fibre-optic communication 
In fibre-optic communication SDM refers to the usage of the transverse dimension of the fibre to separate the channels.

Techniques

Multi-core fibre (MCF) 
Multi-core fibres are fibres designed with more than a single core. Amongst different types of  MCFs exist, “Uncoupled MCF” is the most common in which each core is treated to be an independent optical path resulting in increasing in channel capacity. However, the main limitation to these systems is the presence of inter core crosstalk and ways to deal it as well as the coupling/de-coupling mechanism. Although, in recent times, different splicing techniques, coupling methods and  schemes have been proposed and demonstrated and despite many of the component technologies still being in the development stage, MCF systems already present the capability for huge transmission capacity.

Recently, some developed components technologies for multicore optical fiber are demonstrated, such as three-dimensional Y-splitters between different multicore fibers , a universal interconnection among the same fiber cores, and a device for fast swapping and interchange of wavelength-division multiplexed data among cores of multicore optical fiber.

Multi-mode fibres (MMF) 
Multi-mode fibers are fibres designed to allow multiple modes to propagate through it where each mode is considered as separate channel enhancing its capacity in contrast to single mode fibre (SMF) that only supports single spatial mode, however MMF has two polarizations. The MMFs are limited by high dispersion and attenuation rate causing the signal quality to be diminished over long distances. In addition to this, the MMFs also suffer from intermodal crosstalk and requires digital signal processing to deal with it.

Mode-division multiplexing (MDM) 
Mode-division multiplexing utilizes the transverse spatial modes of the fibre to separate the channels.Mode-division multiplexing (MDM) can be achieved by multiplexing several data inputs into different modes efficiently using multiplexers. There are numerous methods of multiplexing and coupling modes into few mode fibres (FMFs), like photonic lanterns, multi-plane light conversion, and others.

Fibre bundles 
Bundled fibres are also considered a form of SDM, these are massive number of fibres bundled tightly together.

Wireless communications
If the transmitter is equipped with  antennas and the receiver has  antennas, the maximum spatial multiplexing order (the number of streams) is,

if a linear receiver is used. This means that  streams can be transmitted in parallel, ideally leading to an  increase of the spectral efficiency (the number of bits per second per Hz that can be transmitted over the wireless channel). The practical multiplexing gain can be limited by spatial correlation, which means that some of the parallel streams may have very weak channel gains.

Encoding

Open-loop approach 

In an open-loop MIMO system with  transmitter antennas and  receiver antennas, the input-output relationship can be described as

An often encountered problem in open loop spatial multiplexing is to guard against instance of high channel correlation and strong power imbalances between the multiple streams. One such extension which is being considered for DVB-NGH  systems is the so-called enhanced Spatial Multiplexing (eSM) scheme.

Closed-loop approach
A closed-loop MIMO system utilizes Channel State Information (CSI) at the transmitter. In most cases, only partial CSI is available at the transmitter because of the limitations of the feedback channel. In a closed-loop MIMO system the input-output relationship with a closed-loop approach can be described as
		

A precoding matrix  is used to precode the symbols in the vector to enhance the performance. Examples of the reasons are as follows: either the rank of the MIMO channel or the number of receiver antennas is smaller than the number of transmit antennas.

See also

 3G MIMO
 Space–time code
 Space–time trellis code
 WiMAX MIMO
 Fibre-optic communication
 multiplexing

References

IEEE 802
Information theory
Radio resource management